West Bengal University of Health Sciences (WBUHS) is a Public  medical university in Kolkata, West Bengal, India. It was established in 2003 by an Act of the West Bengal Legislative Assembly for better management of the health and medical education-related courses. The main aim of establishing the university is to upgrade the level of medical teaching in the state.

History
Before the establishment of the West Bengal University of Health Sciences (WBUHS), undergraduate and postgraduate level medical teaching in different state medical colleges of West Bengal was supervised by various state universities. This caused a huge disparity between different state medical colleges of West Bengal in terms of teaching and learning process, nature and standards of the evaluation, and most significantly; the recognition of the graduates from the different universities. So all the stakeholders of medical education in the state felt the need for bringing parity in the medical education system.

Under these compelling circumstances, the West Bengal University of Health Sciences (WBUHS) was established under an Act of the West Bengal legislature.  Finally, it became active on 1 January 2003; which is considered as the date of birth for this embodiment of higher education in the fields of medical sciences in the state.

Organisation and Administration

Governance
The Governor of West Bengal is the chancellor of the West Bengal University of Health Sciences. The Vice-chancellor of the West Bengal University of Health Sciences is the chief executive officer of the university. Prof. (Dr.) Suhrita Paul is the current Vice-chancellor of the university.

Affiliations
The West Bengal University of Health Science is an affiliating university and has jurisdiction over all the medical, nursing, and paramedical colleges of the entire state of West Bengal. It has 124 affiliated institutions under its umbrella as of now.

Ranking and Accreditation
In September 2017, West Bengal University of Health Sciences was recognized by the University Grants Commission (U.G.C.) under section 12-B of the UGC Act, 1956.

See also
 List of universities in India
 Chittaranjan National Cancer Institute
 List of colleges and universities in West Bengal

References

External links
 

 
Medical and health sciences universities in India
Universities in Kolkata
Medical colleges in West Bengal
Educational institutions established in 2003
2003 establishments in West Bengal